Baron Kenyon, of Gredington, in the County of Flint, is a title in the Peerage of Great Britain. It was created in 1788 for the lawyer and judge Sir Lloyd Kenyon, 1st Baronet. He served as Master of the Rolls and as Lord Chief Justice of England and Wales. Kenyon had already been created a Baronet, of Gredington in the County of Flint, in 1784. His grandson, the third Baron, briefly represented St Michael's in the House of Commons. His grandson, the fourth Baron, held minor office in the governments of Lord Salisbury, Arthur Balfour and David Lloyd George and also served as Lord Lieutenant of Denbighshire. In 1912 Lord Kenyon assumed by Royal licence the additional surname of Tyrell.  the titles are held by his great-grandson, the seventh Baron, who succeeded his father in 2019.

Barons Kenyon (1788)
Lloyd Kenyon, 1st Baron Kenyon (1732–1802)
George Kenyon, 2nd Baron Kenyon (1776–1855). Kenyon College was named after him.
Lloyd Kenyon, 3rd Baron Kenyon (1805–1869)
Lloyd Tyrell-Kenyon, 4th Baron Kenyon (1864–1927)
Lloyd Tyrell-Kenyon, 5th Baron Kenyon (1917–1993)
Lloyd Tyrell-Kenyon, 6th Baron Kenyon (1947–2019)
Lloyd Nicholas Tyrell-Kenyon, 7th Baron Kenyon (b. 1972)

The heir presumptive is his brother, Hon. Alexander Simon Tyrell-Kenyon (b. 1975)

References

External links
Kidd, Charles, Williamson, David (editors). Debrett's Peerage and Baronetage (1990 edition). New York: St Martin's Press, 1990, 

Baronies in the Peerage of Great Britain
1788 establishments in Great Britain
Noble titles created in 1788